Wyattville is an unincorporated community in Warren Township, Winona County, Minnesota, United States.

The community is located near the junction of Winona County Roads 12 and 25.

Interstate 90 and State Highway 43 (MN 43) are both nearby.  Wyattville had a post office from 1858 to 1902.

Nearby places include Lewiston, Wilson, Winona, and Rushford.

References

Unincorporated communities in Minnesota
Unincorporated communities in Winona County, Minnesota